NVC community W17 (Quercus petraea - Betula pubescens - Dicranum majus woodland) is one of the woodland communities in the British National Vegetation Classification system. It is one of the six communities falling in the "mixed deciduous and oak/birch woodlands" group.

This is a widely distributed community in northern and western Britain and represents mossy deciduous woodland of the uplands. There are four subcommunities.

Community composition

Two constant species are found in the tree canopy of this community:
 Sessile oak (Quercus petraea)
 Downy birch (Betula pubescens)
Eight constant species are found in the field and ground layers of this community:
 Wavy hair grass (Deschampsia flexuosa)
 Greater fork-moss (Dicranum majus)
 Glittering wood-moss (Hylocomium splendens)
 Waved silk-moss (Plagiothecium undulatum)
 Red-stemmed feather-moss (Pleurozium schreberi)
 Bank haircap moss (Polytrichum formosum)
 Little shaggy-moss (Rhytidiadelphus loreus)
 Blueberry (Vaccinium myrtillus)

Rare species associated with the community include Hymenophyllum wilsonii and a number of oceanic bryophytes.

Distribution

This community is widespread throughout upland areas of Britain. The subcommunities show some geographical localisation with W17a predominantly western and W17d predominantly eastern.

Subcommunities

There are four subcommunities:
 W17a : the Isothecium myosuroides-Diplophyllum albicans subcommunity
 W17b : the so-called typical subcommunity
 W17c : the Anthoxanthum odoratum-Agrostis capillaris subcommunity
 W17d : the Rhytidiadelphus triquetrus subcommunity

References

 Rodwell, J. S. (1991) British Plant Communities Volume 1 - Woodlands and scrub  (hardback),  (paperback)

Further reading

Averis, A. et al. (2004). An Illustrated Guide to British Upland Vegetation. Joint Nature Conservation Committee. Peterborough.

W17